HMS Plover was a coastal minelayer built for the Royal Navy in the mid-1930s. She laid over 15,000 mines during World War II and remained on active duty until she was sold for scrap in 1969.

Description
Steam for the engines was provided by two water-tube boilers. The ship's complement was 69 officers and men.

The ship initially mounted two  machine guns, but after war broke out a single 12-pounder (3 in (76.2 mm)) gun was added aft as well as a  Oerlikon autocannon forward. Plover was initially fitted with mine recovery gear, but her mine capacity increased from 80 to 100 after it was removed when World War II began. Sometime during the war she received a Type 286 air warning radar.

Career
HMS Plover was accepted by the Royal Navy on 25 September 1937 and was commissioned on the same day. She was intended to conduct mining trials and was therefore fitted to recover as well as lay mines.

The ship was kept in service after the war and took part in the Fleet Review to celebrate the Coronation of Queen Elizabeth II in 1953. She was sold to Thos. W. Ward in 1969. Plover arrived at their yard in Inverkeithing, Scotland, in April 1969 to begin scrapping.

Notes

References

 

Minelayers of the Royal Navy
Ships built on the River Clyde
1937 ships
World War II minelayers of the United Kingdom